Markus Aigner (born 4 January 1972) is a German retired footballer who played as a midfielder.

External links
 

1972 births
Living people
Austrian footballers
FC Mauerwerk players
Floridsdorfer AC players
SKN St. Pölten players
DSV Leoben players
FC Augsburg players
SV Wacker Burghausen players
Association football midfielders